Liparis dubius is a species of snailfish found in the northwestern Pacific Ocean. Distribution includes the Sea of Japan and Sea of Okhotsk.

References

Fish described in 1930
Fish of East Asia
Fish of the North Pacific
Taxa named by Vladimir Soldatov
dubius